Jan Kociniak (8 November 1937 – 20 April 2007) was a Polish film and theatre actor.

Jan Kociniak was born in Stryj, Poland (now Ukraine). He graduated from The Warsaw Higher Theatrical School in 1961 and for most of his professional career he acted in The Atheneum Theatre in Warsaw. He was also a well known for his performances in feature and TV films, as well as dubbing roles (such as Winnie the Pooh in the Polish-language version).

Kociniak was awarded the Order of Polonia Restituta.

Filmography

Film

1960: Miejsce na ziemi .... Kocoń
1963: Daleka jest droga
1963: Liczę na wasze grzechy .... Adam Panek
1964: Wiano .... Staszek's Pal
1965: The Saragossa Manuscript .... Pacheco's servant (as J. Kociniak)
1966: Niewiarygodne przygody Marka Piegusa (TV Series) .... Militiaman Stonoga
1966: Klub profesora Tutki (TV Series) .... Son of the President
1967: The Night of the Generals .... General Tanz's ordinance (uncredited)
1967: Kochajmy syrenki .... A man who saw the "Pharaoh"
1967: Paryż - Warszawa bez wizy
1968: Lalka .... Auctioneer
1971: Pierścień księżnej Anny .... Pacholek krzyzacki
1971: Kłopotliwy gość .... Paver
1975: Awans .... Clerk Karczewiak
1977: Wielka podróz Bolka i Lolka .... Jeremiasz Pitsbury (voice)
1981: Teddy Bear .... Militiaman
1984: Trzy młyny (TV Mini-Series)
1985: Kobieta w kapeluszu .... Janitor
1985: Miłość z listy przebojów
1985: 5 dni z życia emeryta (TV Series) .... Zbyszek
1985: Jezioro Bodeńskie .... Klaus
1986: Sons and Comrades .... Lieutenant Klaus
1987: Misja specjalna .... Coach Driver
1987: Komediantka .... Actor
1988-1990: Mistrz i Małgorzata (TV Series) .... Bengalski
1991: Calls Controlled .... Guard Wacek (voice, uncredited)
1997: Złotopolscy (TV Series) .... Wolny
1997-1998: Z pianką czy bez (TV Series) .... Kazimierz Suryn
1999: Dom (TV Series) .... Staff manager of FSO
2001: Więzy krwi (TV Series)
2002-2006: Samo życie (TV Series) .... Lucjan Michalak
2003: King Ubu .... Ambassador of France
2007: Ryś .... Postman (final film role)

Guest starring 
1973: Poszukiwany, poszukiwana .... Director's Assistant (uncredited)
1974-1977: Czterdziestolatek (TV Series) .... Sports Club worker
1997-1998: Boża podszewka .... Walukiewicz
1999: Na dobre i na złe (TV Series) .... Henryk Krawczyk
2005: Boża podszewka II (TV Series) .... Bartłomiej Walukiewicz

Polish dubbing 
1958-1988: Yogi Bear .... Car driver
1962-1987: The Jetsons .... Mr. Spacely
1964-1967: The Magilla Gorilla Show .... Mr. Peebles
1966: Winnie the Pooh and the Honey Tree .... Winnie the Pooh
1968: Winnie the Pooh and the Blustery Day .... Winnie the Pooh
1970: Kochajmy straszydła .... Narrator
1974: Winnie the Pooh and Tigger Too! .... Winnie the Pooh
1975: Maya the Bee .... Willy
1977: Wielka podróż Bolka i Lolka .... Jeremiasz Pitsbury
1977: The Many Adventures of Winnie the Pooh .... Winnie the Pooh
1977: The Rescuers .... Bernard
1977: Alicja w Krainie Czarów .... Suseł
1985: The 13 Ghosts of Scooby-Doo
1988-1990: The New Adventures of Winnie the Pooh .... Winnie the Pooh
1990: The Rescuers Down Under .... Bernard
1990: Cartoon All-Stars to the Rescue .... Winnie the Pooh
1994: Królestwo Zielonej Polany .... Narrator
1997: Królestwo Zielonej Polany. Powrót .... Narrator
1998: Rudolph the Red-Nosed Reindeer: The Movie .... Leonard
2000: The Tigger Movie .... Winnie the Pooh

References

External links

1937 births
2007 deaths
People from Stryi
Polish male television actors
Polish male voice actors
Recipients of the Order of Polonia Restituta (1944–1989)
20th-century Polish male actors
Polish male stage actors
Polish male film actors